Listed below are lesser-known ethnolinguistic groups that speak Loloish languages. Most of these groups speak languages of uncertain affiliation within Loloish, and are under-documented or undocumented.

Yunnan (1979) lists the following ethnolinguistic groups that are classified as Yi.
Mengwu 孟武 (exonym: Awu 阿武) of Xichou County. Population: 1,243 as of 1960. Yunnan (1979) lists Mengwu 孟武 twice, and in another entry lists Mengwu 孟武 of Maguan County and Xichou County with a population of 1,379. Also known as Lai (autonym; a branch of the Awu , also called Mengwu ): in Xisa , Xichou; Daping  and Nanwenhe  of Malipo.
Sanda 三达 of Dazhai, Sanda Township, Jinghong City (景洪市三达乡大寨). There were only 2 elderly women who remembered about 40 words. Yunnan (1979) classifies Sanda as a Yi language, but also notes that it has many words of Hani origin. The Sanda have no autonym. Population: 946 as of 1960.
Datou 达头 of Pu'er and Simao. Population: 254 as of 1960. Their traditions and festivals are similar to those of the Yi people of Weishan County.
Aciga 阿次嘎 of Lancang County. Spoken in Yakou Township 雅口乡 and Nanxian Township 南现乡 (now Nuozhadu Town 糯扎渡镇). Population: 50 as of 1960. 100 years ago, they had migrated from Niujian Mountain 牛肩山, Zhenyue County 镇越县 (now renamed as Mengla County), and had spoken a different language that is now extinct. They now speak Chinese and Yi. Aciga is an exonym, as the Aciga do not have an autonym.

A Yi language called Zhayipo 扎依颇 is spoken in Mile County.

Lewu of Jingdong Yi Autonomous County, Yunnan is an extinct Loloish language.

Notes and references
Lama, Ziwo Qiu-Fuyuan (2012), Subgrouping of Nisoic (Yi) Languages, thesis, University of Texas at Arlington (archived)

Yunnan provincial ethnic classification research unit [云南省民族识别研究组]. 1956. Preliminary summary of ethnic classifications in Yunnan province: no. 1, 2 [云南省民族识别研究第一、二阶段初步总结]. Beijing: Central University for Nationalities Research Institute 中央民族学院.

External links
 Listen to a sample of Ache from Global Recordings Network

 
Languages rejected by Glottolog